The 1922–23 Magyar Kupa (English: Hungarian Cup) was the 7th season of Hungary's annual knock-out cup football competition.

Final

See also
 1922–23 Nemzeti Bajnokság I

References

External links
 Official site 
 soccerway.com

1922–23 in Hungarian football
1922–23 domestic association football cups
1922-23